Cyclophora atrimacula is a moth in the  family Geometridae. It is found in Ecuador.

References

Moths described in 1911
Cyclophora (moth)
Moths of South America